Holota is a surname. Notable people with the surname include:

Johnny Holota (1921–1951), Canadian ice hockey player
Lyubov Holota (born 1949), Ukrainian author
Petr Holota (born 1965), Czech footballer
Tomasz Hołota (born 1991), Polish footballer

See also
 

Slavic-language surnames